Adambathia Larsen "Adam" Kwarasey (born 12 December 1987) is a retired professional footballer who plays as a goalkeeper. Born in Norway, Kwarasey represents Ghana at international level.

Early and personal life
Kwarasey was born in Oslo, Norway to a father from Ghana and a mother from Norway. He holds both  Ghanaian and Norwegian passports.

Club career

Strømsgodset
Kwarasey played youth football with Trosterud and Vålerenga. After moving to Strømsgodset, he made his debut on 6 May 2007. He scored his first senior goal in 2010, converting a penalty kick in the cup against Modum. Kwarasey was the captain of the club in 2013 when Strømsgodset won Tippeligaen for the first time since 1970. He also won the Kniksen Award as the best goalkeeper in the 2013 season.

Kwarasey announced on 31 October 2014 that he would leave Strømsgodset after the 2014 season, when his contract expired.

Portland Timbers
Kwarasey signed for the Major League Soccer club Portland Timbers in December 2014. In the one-game knockout round of the MLS Cup 2015 playoffs against Sporting Kansas City, the game went to a penalty-kick shootout. The shootout was tied after all 10 field players had taken their shots, so the goalkeepers went next; Kwarasey scored his shot, then saved his opposite number Jon Kempin's shot, winning his team the shootout and enabling it to advance to the next round. The Timbers won the next two rounds and then the 2015 MLS Cup, the league championship.

During the match against San Jose Earthquakes on 16 April 2016, Kwarasey suffered a finger injury, which turned out to be a torn ligament that would rule him out for a month.

Rosenborg
Kwarasey returned to Norwegian football in July 2016 after signing a three-and-a-half year contract with Rosenborg. The Timbers stated that this move "helps free up cap space" and "made sense for Kwarasey and his family." The lanky Ghanaian international won the Tippeligaen and the Norwegian Football Cup in his only season with the Norwegian football giants. This was his fourth time of winning a medal in the Norway, after captaining Strømsgodset to their first league title since 1970. He left Rosenborg in 2017 for Brøndby in Denmark.

Brøndby
On 9 January 2017, it was confirmed by Brøndby that Kwarasey had signed a four-year contract with the club.

Vålerenga
On 6 June 2017, Kwarasey Larsen agreed a three-year contract with former youth club Vålerenga. Due to the Norwegian transfer window which opens on 21 July, he will not be available to play competitively for Vålerenga until that date, although he will be able to train with the team. He left the club in August 2020.

International career
In November 2007, Kwarasey declared that he would play international football for Ghana. However, he played a friendly match for Norway under-21 in 2008. In October 2010, Kwarasey received his Ghanaian passport and became eligible to play for Ghana. On 30 July 2011, Kwarasey was called up to the Ghana national team for a match against Nigeria. That match was postponed due to security reasons, although Kwarasey confirmed his intention to become Ghana's first-choice goalkeeper. He made his international debut for Ghana on 2 September 2011 in an 2012 Africa Cup of Nations qualifier against Swaziland, before playing in a friendly match against Brazil at Craven Cottage in London three days later. Kwarasey was named to Ghana's 23-man squad for the 2012 Africa Cup of Nations. He was the team's first choice goalkeeper throughout the tournament, as the Black Stars finished in fourth place.

Kwarasey made two appearances for the Black Stars during their successful 2014 FIFA World Cup qualifying campaign, serving as understudy to Fatau Dauda. On 2 June 2014, Kwarasey was named in Ghana's squad for the 2014 FIFA World Cup. He started in goal for the Black Stars in the team's opening match, a 2–1 defeat against the United States in Natal. After his team defeat, he planned to quit playing with Black Stars. In August 2014, he was dropped from the national team.

Career statistics

International

Honours
Strømsgodset
Tippeligaen: 2013
Norwegian Football Cup: 2010

Portland Timbers
MLS Cup: 2015
Western Conference (Playoffs): 2015

Rosenborg
Tippeligaen: 2016
Norwegian Football Cup: 2016

Individual
Best Goalkeeper in Tippeligaen: 2013
MLS Save of the Year: 2015

References

External links
 
 

1987 births
Living people
Footballers from Oslo
Citizens of Ghana through descent
Ghanaian people of Norwegian descent
Ghanaian footballers
Ghanaian expatriate footballers
Ghana international footballers
Association football goalkeepers
Vålerenga Fotball players
Strømsgodset Toppfotball players
Portland Timbers players
Rosenborg BK players
Brøndby IF players
Norwegian footballers
Norwegian expatriate footballers
Norway under-21 international footballers
Norwegian people of Ghanaian descent
2012 Africa Cup of Nations players
2013 Africa Cup of Nations players
2014 FIFA World Cup players
Eliteserien players
Major League Soccer players
Norwegian Second Division players
Danish Superliga players
Expatriate soccer players in the United States
Norwegian expatriate sportspeople in the United States
Ghanaian expatriate sportspeople in the United States
Expatriate men's footballers in Denmark